Archduchess Maria Christina Isabelle Natalie of Austria, full German name: Maria Christina Isabelle Natalie, Erzherzogin von Österreich (17 November 1879, Kraków, Grand Duchy of Cracow, Austria-Hungary – 6 August 1962, Anholt) was a member of the Teschen branch of the House of Habsburg-Lorraine and an Archduchess of Austria and Princess of Bohemia, Hungary, and Tuscany by birth. Through her marriage to Emanuel Alfred, Hereditary Prince of Salm-Salm, Maria Christina was also Hereditary Princess of Salm-Salm.

Early life
Maria Christina was the eldest child and daughter of Archduke Friedrich, Duke of Teschen and his wife Princess Isabella of Croÿ.

Marriage and issue
Maria Christina married Emanuel, Hereditary Prince of Salm-Salm, son of Alfred, 7th Prince of Salm-Salm and his wife Countess Rosa of Lützow, on 10 May 1902 in Vienna. Maria Christina and Emanuel had five children:

Princess Isabelle of Salm-Salm (13 February 1903 – 10 January 2009) married Felix, Baron of Loë
Princess Rosemary of Salm-Salm (13 April 1904 – 3 May 2001) married Archduke Hubert Salvator of Austria (1894–1971)
Nikolaus Leopold, 8th Prince of Salm-Salm (14 February 1906 – 15 January 1988) married (1) Princess Ida of Wrede (div. 1948), (2) Eleonore von Zitzewitz (div. 1961), (3) Maria Moret, (4) Christiane Kostecki
Princess Cäcilie of Salm-Salm (8 March 1911 – 11 March 1991) married Franz Josef, Prince of Salm-Reifferscheidt-Krautheim and Dyck
Prince Franz of Salm-Salm (18 September 1912 – 27 August 1917)

Ancestry

References

1879 births
1962 deaths
Nobility from Kraków
House of Habsburg-Lorraine
Austrian princesses
Austrian women in World War I